The 1907 World Allround Speed Skating Championships took place at 21 and 22 February 1907 at the ice rink Øen Stadion in Trondheim, Norway.

There was no defending champion.

There was no World champion declared, no one won three of the four distances.

Allround results 

  * = Fell
 NC = Not classified
 NF = Not finished
 NS = Not started
 DQ = Disqualified
Source: SpeedSkatingStats.com

Rules 
Four distances have to be skated:
 500m
 1500m
 5000m
 10000m

One could only win the World Championships by winning at least three of the four distances, so there would be no World Champion if no skater won at least three distances.

Silver and bronze medals were not awarded.

References 

World Allround Speed Skating Championships, 1907
1907 World Allround
World Allround, 1907
Sports competitions in Trondheim
1907 in Norwegian sport
February 1907 sports events
20th century in Trondheim